Trishira is a rakshasa featured in the Ramayana. He is one of the sons of Ravana and Dhanyamalini and his brothers are Atikaya, Narantaka and Devantaka.

Ramayana
The Ramayana states that Trishira engaged Hanuman in a fight and hit him with a number of arrows. At this, Hanuman told him that his arrows were like flowers being showered on his body. Thereafter, a duel ensued, in which Hanuman killed Trishira.

See also
Ravana
Ramayana

References

Trishira

Rakshasa in the Ramayana

Rakshasa